The Abdali-I (Urdu:ابدالى-ا; official codename: Hatf–II Abdali) is a supersonic and tactical surface-to-surface short-range ballistic missile (SRBM) designed and developed by the Space and Upper Atmosphere Research Commission (SUPARCO), and is named after Ahmad Shah Durrani. It is currently in operational service with the Pakistan Armed Forces.

The Abdali program was conceived and originally designed by SUPARCO in the 1990s. The program's first derivative was originally designed as the two-stage version of the Hatf-I, essentially a solid-propellant stage was attached to the bottom of a Hatf-I. However, the program was canceled in 1994, likely due to the purchase of the M-11 missiles from the People’s Republic of China. In 1995, SUPARCO successfully persuaded and designed a new module for the Abdali program which was started the same year.

Design and specification
Its accuracy is sufficient for use against military targets such as bases or airfields. It is carried on a road mobile Transporter-Erector-Launcher (TEL) vehicle. The use of solid propellant and the TEL vehicle make the missile easy to store, transport and fire.

The Abdali-I has a range of 150 km—190 km and an accuracy of 100m—150m CEP. It is equipped with an inertial guidance system with terminal guidance. It can be equipped with a variable payload up to 500 kg, and can carry single HE explosive or cluster sub-munition warheads. It has a launch weight of 1,750 kg. It uses a single-stage solid propellant engine and has a length of 9.75m and a width of 0.56m.

Development history and current status 
Originally, the Abdali program was conceived in 1987 and designs of the missiles were adopted by the Space and Upper Atmosphere Research Commission, but it never got the adequate funds for the program. In 1993, the Pakistan government took initiatives and considerations on acquiring M-11 missiles from China for a quick deployments. However, the international pressure and the MTCR's tight monitoring of prevention of any transfer of missile technology led to a denial from China to export the M-11 missiles to Pakistan.

After being rebuffed due to international pressure, the Space Research Commission officials reached out to the government and presented convincing arguments to Prime Minister Benazir Bhutto on the feasibility of Abdali program. With the backing of the Prime Minister Benazir Bhutto, the SRC began the development of the Abdali program, as its features closely related to the M-11 missiles. A new design was conceived in 1997 by the SRC and continues to developed till 2000s.

On 28 May 2002, the Abdali–I was first successfully test fired from Sonmiani Test Range and reached its designated range of 110mi (180km). The Pakistani military information source, the ISPR noted the test trial as "successful" and concluded its testing "for now". Further and additional tests were conducted on 2005 and 2006. Abdali is currently deployed and under production. Concurrently, the Abdali-I was again tested out from the TEL system and continues to reach its range of 110mi (180km). Its last tests were conducted on 13 February 2013, the Abdali-I was test fired.

Upon being developed by the SRC, the missile's name was traced in the remembrance of the Afghan King Ahmed Shah Abdali whose dynasty founded the Great Afghanistan. Afghan Emperor Ahmed Shah Abdali was noted to have been in frequent conflict with India.

References

Science and technology in Pakistan
SUPARCO missions
Short-range ballistic missiles of Pakistan
Military equipment introduced in the 2000s